Hot Springs may refer to:

Places

United States
 Hot Springs, Arkansas
 Hot Springs National Park, Arkansas
 Hot Springs, Placer County, California
 Hot Springs, Montana
 Hot Springs, Nevada
 Hot Springs, North Carolina
 Hot Springs, South Dakota
 Hot Springs (Big Bend National Park), Texas
 Hot Springs, Virginia
 Hot Springs, Washington
 Hot Springs County, Wyoming
 Hot Springs State Park, Wyoming
 Hot Springs, New Mexico the former name of the town of Truth or Consequences, New Mexico

Canada
 Hot Springs Camp, the original name of Ainsworth Hot Springs, British Columbia, Canada
 Hot Springs Cove near Tofino, British Columbia, Canada
 Hotspring Island, part of the Haida Gwaii archipelago, British Columbia, Canada

Others
 Hot Springs, Chang Chenmo Valley, India
 Hot Springs, Manicaland, in Manicaland Province, Zimbabwe
 Modern Caldas de Reis in Spain was called Aquae calidae in ancient times

Other uses
 Hot Springs (band), a Canadian indie rock band
 Hot Springs (novel), a novel written by Stephen Hunter

See also 
 Hot spring
 Hot springs around the world
 Onsen, Japanese hot spring 
 List of hot springs in the United States
 List of hot springs in Japan